Umm Birka (also spelled Umm Baraka) is a settlement in the Al Khor municipality in Qatar.

Etymology
Umm Birka derives its name from the Arabic word "barikat," which means "blessing." It was named this in reference to a nearby well.

Geography
Umm Birka is situated in north-east Qatar. The village of Umm Al Qahab is nearby.

Water reservoir
The settlement is one of five sites for the government-sponsored project to develop reservoirs in the country. Once completed, the reservoirs are expected to be the largest in the world in their category, with a total length of 650 km and constructed at a cost of QR 14.5 billion. In June 2018, the first phase of the project was completed.

References

Al Khor
Populated places in Al Khor